Pain Is Love is the third studio album by American rapper Ja Rule. Executive produced by Irv Gotti, it was released on October 2, 2001 by Murder Inc. Records and distributed by Def Jam Recordings. Although, the album received a mixed reception from critics, Pain Is Love debuted at number one on the Billboard 200 and was supported by four singles: "Livin' It Up", "I'm Real (Murder Remix)", "Always on Time" and "Down Ass Bitch". It was certified triple-platinum by the Recording Industry Association of America (RIAA) for selling over 3,000,000 copies. Pain is Love received numerous awards and nominations including a nomination for Best Rap Album at the 44th Grammy Awards. The album's first two singles "Livin' It Up" featuring Case and "Always on Time" featuring Ashanti collected nominations for Best Rap/Sung Collaboration in 2002 and 2003.

Critical reception

Pain is Love received generally mixed reviews from music critics. At Metacritic, which assigns a normalized rating out of 100 to reviews from mainstream critics, the album received an average score of 59, based on 10 reviews.

AllMusic's Jason Birchmeier praised the album for fine-tuning the formula set by Rule 3:36 of having R&B crossover singles and hardcore rap tracks to balance out the whole record. An editor from HipHopDX said that hardcore tracks like "Dial M for Murder" and "Worldwide Gangsta" felt like forced attempts to bring back Ja's thug persona, but praised the album for having tracks that contain ear-grabbing lines and good beats, saying that "Pain Is Love is another positive establishment that will indeed create more popularity and more fan acknowledgement for Ja Rule."
Steve 'Flash' Juon of RapReviews found Ja's singing voice on some tracks intolerable but gave the album credit for containing tracks that display Irv Gotti's producing talents and Ja's adequate lyricism, concluding that, "Ja Rule will live up to the latter half of his name and dominate the charts for the latter half of 2001 with an album that is undoubtedly his most solid release to date."

Soren Baker of the Los Angeles Times gave credit to the singles "Livin' It Up" and "I'm Real" for being the album's strong points but criticized tracks like "The Inc" and "Worldwide Gangsta" for being bland and less effective, saying they "recycle hard-core themes without adding any clever phrasings or creative beat work to compensate for their ordinariness." Nathan Rabin of The A.V. Club criticized the album for lacking substance to go with the catchy pop hooks and Ja for making what they perceive as failed attempts to copy 2Pac, specifically on the penultimate feature track "So Much Pain" concluding that "even at less than his best, 2Pac still conveys a sense of urgency and purpose that illustrates incontestably the huge chasm separating the real deal from a canny imitation."

Commercial performance
Pain Is Love spawned two number one hit singles and managed to debuted at number one on the US Billboard 200 chart, thus giving Ja Rule his second US number-one album in his career and also ending the three-week reign of fellow Def Jam artist Jay-Z's fifth studio album, The Blueprint, which was released on the same day as the September 11 attacks. With first-week sales of 361,000 copies, Pain is Love was certified three times platinum in the United States, as of June 2002. It also received a Grammy nomination for Best Rap Album in 2002 but lost to OutKast's Stankonia.

Track listing
Credits adapted from the album's liner notes.

Notes
 some editions of the album add the song "Put It on Me" as track 17.
  signifies a co-producer

Sample credits
 "Dial M for Murder" contains interpolations of "Castle Walls", written by Dennis DeYoung and performed by Styx.
 "Livin' It Up" contains excerpts from "Do I Do", written and performed by Stevie Wonder.
"I'm Real (Murder Remix)" contains an interpolation of "All Night Long" written by Rick James and performed by Mary Jane Girls.
"So Much Pain" contains excerpts from "Pain", written by Dave Grusin, Earl Klugh, Tupac Shakur, and Randy Walker, and performed by 2Pac featuring Stretch.

Charts

Weekly charts

Year-end charts

Certifications

See also
 List of Billboard 200 number-one albums of 2001
 List of Billboard number-one R&B albums of 2001
 List of number-one albums from the 2000s (New Zealand)

References

2001 albums
Ja Rule albums
Def Jam Recordings albums
Albums produced by Irv Gotti